The 1983 Birmingham City Council election took place on 5 May 1983 to elect members of  Birmingham City Council in the West Midlands, England. One third of the council was up for election and the Conservative Party kept overall control of the council.

Result

References

1983
Birmingham City Council election
City Council election, 1983